Forged in Flame is a heavy metal/rock band formed in Cleveland, Ohio, United States, in 2007. The band has often been described as stoner rock. The band's signature is a prog-doom-metal with a vintage Sabbath chaser. The band has self-released a four song EP  “Forged In Flame” which has sold close to 1,000 copies, and a vinyl 7” split "Forged In Ohio" with The Ohio Sky. More recently they contributed exclusive song “The Underground” for Australian label Planet Fuzz Record’s compilation Cowbells and Cobwebs. The band has been compared to acts such as Corrosion of Conformity, the Cult and Life of Agony. The band is not currently signed to any label.

Members

Current
Gary Kane – Vocals
Scott Young – Guitar
Cyril Blandino - Guitar
Justin Meyers - Bass
Jon Vinson - Drums

Former members
Jay Bonnell - Guitar
Jason Shaffer - Guitar
Justin Haberer - Guitar
Chris Konowal - Bass
Jay Christner - Guitar
Jason Clark - Bass Guitar

Select discography
"Forged in Flame" EP, 2008
"Cowbells and Cobwebs" – PlanetFuzz Records Compilation, 2010	
"Forged in Ohio" EP, Vinyl 7" split w/The Ohio Sky, 2010

References

External links
 FORGED IN FLAME | Listen and Stream Free Music, Albums, New Releases, Photos, Videos

Heavy metal musical groups from Ohio
Musical groups from Cleveland
American stoner rock musical groups